Eunsan byeolsinje is Korea's traditional shamanism ceremony which is selected as the ninth Important Intangible Cultural Property of Korea next to Ganggang sullae. It is performed mainly in eunsanri eunsanmyeon Chungcheongnam-do Buyeo Korea by a shaman.

History
In eunsanmyeon Chungcheongnam-do Buyeo, shaman have a ritual for a mountain spirit every beginning of the year and have a special a ritual for ghosts every other year. There is a mountain in the north of the Eunsan Market about 70–80 meters high and there are a shrine at the south of the mountain. It was started to console the ghosts of the town for the health of local residents. According to the writing of the shrine, Eunsan Province was a battle field in Baekje and the ghosts of soldiers were remained to make an infectious disease and natural disaster. So people in town made the shrine to stop disaster.

Procedures
Eunsan byeolsinje is held every other year. The annual ceremony which is held at Byeolshindang, the shrine, is called Sanje and the other biennial ceremony, Byeolsinje, is much bigger than the Sanje. Once the performance date is determined, the ceremony maintains before and after the main performance. The total ceremony is about ten days but today it is usually 8 days long. It took place at Byeolsindang, the shrine and march the town.

Transmission
Like many other local festivals in Korea, Eunsan byeolsinje also stopped during the era under the colonial administration of imperial Japan and restarted with Korean independence. Currently, Cha Jin-yong, Park Chang-gu, and Hwang Nam-hee were additionally designated as holders of Eunsan byeolsinje and they are preserving and transmitting the play.

References
Korean Cultural Heritage Administration 

Korean Culture Information Service

Korean culture